Nabinagar Assembly constituency is an assembly constituency for Bihar Legislative Assembly in Aurangabad district, Bihar. It comes under Karakat (Lok Sabha constituency).

Members of Legislative Assembly

^ denotes by-poll

Election results

2020

References

External links
 

Assembly constituencies of Bihar